Soltan-e Velayat (also Romanized as Solţān-e Velāyat, Soltan Valayat, and Solţān Velāyat) is a village in Mohammadabad Rural District, in the Central District of Marvdasht County, Fars Province, Iran. At the 2006 census, its population was 1,176, in 270 families.

References 

Populated places in Marvdasht County